Ceraspis elegans is a species of scarab beetles in the subfamily Melolonthinae. It is found in Brazil (São Paulo) and Central America (Honduras).

References

External links 

 

Melolonthinae
Beetles described in 1891
Insects of Brazil
Insects of Central America